This page lists public opinion polls conducted for the 2022 French presidential election the first round of which was held on 10 April 2022. Since no candidate won a majority of the vote in the first round, the second round election was held between the top two candidates on 24 April 2022.

First round

Graphical summary 
The following graphical summary represents the polling numbers of the following candidates:
 Nathalie Arthaud (Lutte Ouvrière)
 Philippe Poutou (Nouveau Parti anticapitaliste)
 Fabien Roussel (Parti communiste français)
 Jean-Luc Mélenchon (La France insoumise)
 Christiane Taubira (divers gauche, withdrawn)
 Anne Hidalgo (Parti socialiste)
 Arnaud Montebourg (divers gauche, withdrawn)
 Yannick Jadot (Europe Écologie Les Verts)
 Emmanuel Macron (La République en Marche!)
 Jean Lassalle (Résistons!)
 Valérie Pécresse (Les Républicains)
 Nicolas Dupont-Aignan (Debout la France)
 Marine Le Pen (Rassemblement national)
 Éric Zemmour (Reconquête)

2022

Official campaign 
This table below lists polls completed since the publication of the official list of candidates on 7 March.

March

February

January

2021

December

September–November

January–September

2017–2020

Second round

Macron vs. Le Pen

Graphical summary

Other potential matchups

The following polls reflect matchups involving a candidate who did not place in the top two in the first round.

Mélenchon vs. Macron

Graphical summary

Macron vs. Zemmour

Graphical summary

Macron vs. Pécresse

Graphical summary

Polls involving withdrawn candidates

The head-to-head polls below included Xavier Bertrand, before he failed to secure his party's nomination at the 2021 The Republicans congress.

Macron vs. Bertrand 

This graph shows all polls conducted by Harris Interactive since October 2021.

Bertrand vs. Le Pen

Footnotes

References

Opinion polling in France
2022 French presidential election